The Conservative Republican Party (Portuguese: Partido Republicano Conservador, PRC) was a Brazilian political party founded in October 1910 to represent the republican and oligarchic ideals of agrarian elites of states discontented with the domination of the states of São Paulo and Minas Gerais ("café com leite") during the República Velha.

Its main representatives were Rio Grande do Sul Senator José Gomes Pinheiro Machado and Marshal Hermes da Fonseca, who was elected president of the republic from 1910 to 1914.

The PRC declined from 1916 with the death of Pinheiro Machado. Like all political parties it was finally abolished by the Estado Novo in 1937.

First Brazilian Republic
Defunct political parties in Brazil
Political parties established in 1910
Conservative parties in Brazil
Republican parties
Political parties disestablished in 1937
1910 establishments in Brazil
1937 disestablishments in Brazil